Ceyda Aktaş (born August 18, 1994 in Ankara, Turkey) is a Turkish volleyball player.

Ceyda describes herself as having been hyperactive in her childhood. For this, her parents canalized her to performing sports and dancing. She first began with playing basketball, but left it because she was not interested anymore. Ceyda then learned and performed Latin dances, participating at dance competitions as well. Due to her physique, she was discovered by volleyball coaches Zeycan Acar and Taner Atik, who visited her class in the school while searching for potential volleyballers. At the age of ten, Ceyda began playing volleyball in 2004 as a member of Ankara VakıfBank's girls team.

After having played for TVF Sport High School between 2009-2011, she transferred to the Istanbul club VakıfBank Türk Telekom in the 2011-12 season. She returned to her hometown to study at TED University. Ceyda is currently with the TED Ankara Kolejliler. Aktaş debuted in the Turkey girls' youth national volleyball team in 2011 and is currently a member of the Turkey women's junior national volleyball team. She wears number 7.

Clubs
  Ankara VakıfBank (2004-2009)
  TVF Sport High School (2009-2011)
  VakıfBank Türk Telekom (2011-2012)
  TED Ankara Kolejliler (2012-2013)
  Beşiktaş J.K. (2013-2014)
  Çanakkale Belediyespor (2014-2015)
  Halkbank Ankara (2015-2016)
  Nilüfer Belediyespor (2016-2017)
  Beylikdüzü (2017-2018)
  Beşiktaş J.K. (2018-2019)
  Kuzeyboru Spor Club (2019-2020)
  PTT Spor (2020-2021)

Awards

Individuals
 2013 FIVB Junior World Championship "Best Opposite"

National team
2011 CEV Girls Youth Volleyball European Championship - 
2011 FIVB Girls Youth World Championship - 
2012 Women's Junior European Volleyball Championship -

See also
 Turkish women in sports

References

1994 births
Sportspeople from Ankara
Living people
Turkish women's volleyball players
VakıfBank S.K. volleyballers